The Mickey Renaud Captain's Trophy is an award in the Ontario Hockey League which is given to one team captain every year. The award was introduced on February 4, 2009, at the 2009 OHL All-Star Classic hosted at the WFCU Centre in Windsor. The award is given to "the OHL team captain that best exemplifies leadership on and off the ice, with a passion and dedication to the game of hockey and his community" as was demonstrated by Renaud throughout his OHL career.

Renaud was the captain of the Windsor Spitfires, and a fifth round draft pick for the Calgary Flames, before his sudden death on February 18, 2008, due to hypertrophic cardiomyopathy. The Spitfires retired his number 18 on September 25, 2008. Renaud was the son of former NHL defenceman, Mark Renaud.

Recipients
 Recipients of the Mickey Renaud Captain's Trophy.

See also
 List of Canadian Hockey League awards

References

External links
 Ontario Hockey League
 

Ontario Hockey League trophies and awards
Awards established in 2009
1988 births
2008 deaths